Wingate Park is a suburb of the city of Pretoria, South Africa. Located south-east of Pretoria CBD and just west of Moreleta Park in a leafy, established area that is home to the city's medium expensive real estate.

References

Suburbs of Pretoria